was a 20th-century Japanese commercial artist and woodblock printmaker. He was a prolific artist of the shin-hanga and sōsaku-hanga styles. Okuyama is noted for his landscape prints, both in color and black-and-white, as well as his simple prints of scenes that interject elements of the modernization of Japan into an otherwise traditional view.

Biography 

Gihachiro Okuyama was born in the city of Sagae, Yamagata, in the Tohoku region, on February 17, 1907. He began as a commercial artist, creating advertising art for many different companies and establishing his own advertising company in 1931. He created successful commercial art for the Japan Wool Company and Nikka Whiskey.

Okuyama studied printmaking with Gajin Kosaka beginning in 1923, as well as with noted artist Kendo Ishii, and began exhibiting prints with the Nihon Sosaku Hanga Association in 1927. During World War 2, he was a member of the Nihon Hanga Hokokai, an organization created to ensure access to production materials for hanga artists during the war.  After the end of the war, he created the Nihon Hanga Kenkyusho to develop an avenue for hanga artists to publish and market their works.

Artistic style 
Okuyama was an extremely prolific artist, creating over 1000 works in his lifetime. He moved freely between the shin-hanga and sōsaku-hanga styles.  His shin-hanga works are consistent with other artists in this style, with evocative colors and smooth gradations giving the works depth and realism. His sosaku hanga works are intentionally rustic, either in black and white or a limited color palette. These works often feature modern technological intrusions, like metal truss bridges or electric transmission towers, a juxtaposition of westernization into Japanese rural scenes.

References

Bibliography 
 Helen Merritt and Nanako Yamada, Guide to Modern Japanese Woodblock Prints: 1900-1975, published by University of Hawaii Press, Honolulu, 1992 .
 James King, Beyond the Great Wave: The Japanese Landscape Print, 1727-1960, published by Peter Lang, Bern, 2010

External links 
Okuyama Gihachiro - artelino

1907 births
1981 deaths
Japanese printmakers
Ukiyo-e artists
Shin hanga artists
20th-century Japanese painters
20th-century printmakers
Artists from Yamagata Prefecture